The Advance Petroleum Revenue Tax Act 1986 (c 68) is an Act of the Parliament of the United Kingdom which provided for the repayment of advance petroleum revenue tax (APRT) to a participator in an oil field where the net profit period has not been reached.

Background 
The Advance Petroleum Revenue Tax Act implemented the proposal announced by the Chancellor of the Exchequer in the Autumn Statement to accelerate, on a targeted basis, the arrangements for the repayment of advance petroleum revenue tax due to oil companies.

The fall in world oil prices in 1986 had a serious impact on the economics of North Sea development, resulting in cutbacks in activity. Companies involved in North Sea activity had reassessed their plans to take low oil prices into account, but some of them faced the more immediate problems caused by a shortage of the cash available to go ahead with new and existing developments.

The Act was aimed at alleviating companies' cash flow problems. It concentrated its effects on those companies where the reduction in cash flow from their North Sea operations could act as a real constraint on their ability to go ahead with development work. It also recognised the importance of providing finance for the companies as soon as possible in order to avoid any interruption to development activity by cash flow difficulties. Under the provisions of the APRT Act, 75 per cent—that is, £230 million—of the total repayments went to independent, medium-sized and smaller companies. Repayments were subject to a limit of £15 million per company per field and, in all, the APRT Act increased the amount of cash available for investment in the North Sea by around £300 million.

Advance Petroleum Revenue Tax Act 1986 
The Advance Petroleum Revenue Tax Act 1986 (chapter 68) received Royal Assent on 18 December 1986. Its long title is ‘An Act to provide for the repayment of certain amounts of advance petroleum revenue tax'.

Provisions 
The Act comprises two Sections and a Schedule:

 Section 1. Repayment of APRT where net profit period not yet reached.
 Section 2. Short title and construction
 Schedule. Net Profit period

See also 
 Oil and gas industry in the United Kingdom
 North Sea Oil
 Petroleum Act

References 

United Kingdom Acts of Parliament 1986
History of the petroleum industry in the United Kingdom